Hypercompe decora is a moth of the family Erebidae first described by Francis Walker in 1855. It is found in Mexico, Cuba and Haiti.

References

decora
Moths described in 1855